Ambt Vollenhove is a former municipality in the Dutch province of Overijssel. It consisted of the countryside surrounding the city of Vollenhove, which was a separate municipality.

Ambt Vollenhove existed from 1818 to 1942 when it became a part of Vollenhove.

References

Former municipalities of Overijssel
Steenwijkerland